Michael Sandor Sommer (October 9, 1934 – April 23, 2022) was an American football player from Washington, D.C.

Sommer attended Woodrow Wilson High School in Washington, DC where he was an ALL High running back, leading the Tigers to the Interhigh championship in 1952 scoring 5 TDs against archrival Western. A week later, WW defeated Catholic league champion St Johns for the City title in Griffith Stadium, 24-6. Sommer ran for  a 44 yard TD and threw 23 yards for another score.  Sommer was also the Interhigh's Sprint champion in track that year.

Sommer played three seasons as a back at George Washington. The team had a combined record of 15-12-1 during Mike's career and defeated UTEP in the 1957 Sun Bowl, 13-0. In 1955 and 1957, Sommer was named in All-Southern Conference first-team and was drafted as the 16th player in the 1958 NFL Draft by the hometown Washington Redskins.

Sommer was an American football halfback in the National Football League, playing 3 years for the Washington Redskins and 3 years for the Baltimore Colts.  He also played 1 year in the American Football League for the Oakland Raiders.

Sommer practiced emergency medicine in Lewes, DE with Beebe Medical Ctr. He received his medical degree from George Washington Univ. Sch. of Med. & Hlth. Sci., Washington DC.

See also
 List of NCAA major college yearly punt and kickoff return leaders

References

1934 births
2022 deaths
American football halfbacks
Baltimore Colts players
Oakland Raiders players
People from Washington, D.C.
George Washington Colonials football players
Washington Redskins players
George Washington University alumni
George Washington University School of Medicine & Health Sciences alumni
Physicians from Washington, D.C.
20th-century American physicians
American Football League players